Freight Farms is a Boston-based agriculture technology company and was the first to manufacture and sell "container farms": hydroponic farming systems retrofitted inside intermodal freight containers. Freight Farms also develops farmhand, a hydroponic farm management and automation software platform, and the largest connected network of hydroponic farmers in the world. The company has installed more than 200 farms around the world, on behalf of individuals, entrepreneurs, educational and corporate campuses, and soil farmers.

In 2018 the company announced Grown by Freight Farms, an on-site farming service for institutions and organizations that would benefit from food grown on-site, but would prefer not to staff their own container farm internally.

Early history 
In 2010, while experimenting with rooftop gardening projects in the Boston area, Jon Friedman and Brad McNamara realized that shipping containers, common to Boston's port, would make sturdy and standardized substructures for vertical farms. Furthermore, refrigerated containers feature insulation that would make it possible to maintain internal environmental conditions year-round in any location. International adoption of freight containers for transportation also meant such a vertical farm could shipped anywhere in the world with relative ease.

In 2011, the two co-founded Freight Farms and, after a successful crowd-funding campaign on Kickstarter, hand-built the first container farm prototype on the Clark University campus in Worcester, Massachusetts.

The Leafy Green Machine 

In 2013, Freight Farms began to manufacture and sell container farms under the model name Leafy Green Machine (LGM).

Each Leafy Green Machine was a retrofit 40-ft. refrigerated container, and was divided into two sections: the seedling station, and the main growth area. The seedling station consisted of a multifunction worktable featuring irrigated germination shelves where seedlings sprouted from seeds. The main growth area consisted of 256 vertical crop columns, irrigated with an overhead drip hydroponic system. Each column could detach from the hydroponic circuit and lock into place on the seedling table, meaning all planting, transplanting, and harvesting could be accomplished at waist level without bending down.

Both sections were exposed to high-efficiency LED arrays that provide plants with the energy required for photosynthesis, and all excess water was recirculated, filtered, and reclaimed. The average Leafy Green Machine consumed less than five gallons of water and 125 kWh of electricity per day. A skilled farmer could grow up to four tons of food annually in one LGM.

Major sales included Google, Ford Foundation, Sodexo, Compass Group, and Square Roots.

In February 2019, Freight Farms announced that after five years and eight design iterations, the 2018 Leafy Green Machine would be succeeded by the company's next-generation container farm, the Greenery.

The Greenery 
Freight Farms' next-generation container farm was conceptualized based on feedback from existing farmers, and organized around three design goals: better yields, improved sustainability, and more IoT-connected automation. Improving on the technology and design of its predecessor, the crop columns and LED array are replaced by plant panels and LED panels respectively, which can slide laterally to accommodate larger crops or in-row farming work. The output of the LED array is also upgraded, meaning plants will grow more quickly, and the seedling table is upgraded to supply the farm with sufficient seedlings.

Farmhand 
Farmhand (styled "farmhand") is a software platform developed in-house by Freight Farms, designed to allow hydroponic growers to control farm components remotely, automate certain tasks, analyze past and current growing data, and manage their business. The software was originally developed for Freight Farms' customers, but is now compatible with any hydroponic operation that uses a grow controller.

Key features include:

Automation Programming – Cycle timings for LEDs, nutrient dosing, pH management, and climate control.

Sensor Data Management – Realtime readings for air and water temperature, ambient humidity,  levels, and pH.

Notifications – Mobile push notifications if any readings fall outside target ranges.

Webcam Connectivity – Support for one or more in-farm web cameras.

Harvest Tracking – Support for a wireless Harvest Tracking Scale, allowing users to weigh harvests and track performance over time.

Grown by Freight Farms 
Grown by Freight Farms (or "Grown") is an on-site farming service offered by Freight Farms and intended for medium and large institutions like educational campuses, office parks, retail locations, hospitals, and residential buildings.

In contrast to an outright container farm purchase, Grown clients subscribe to the service for a period of time. Freight Farms, in turn, installs one or more container farms at the desired location, employs a farmer to manage the day-to-day operation of that farm, and delivers the resulting produce to the subscriber. Delivery comes in two types: "Grown to Share", a CSA program managed by Freight Farms, or "Grown to Supply", which is simple produce delivery to a kitchen, prep station, or other destination.

References

External links

Kickstarter-funded products
Hydroponics
Agriculture companies of the United States